Avshar is a village in the Ararat Municipality of the Ararat Province of Armenia. It hosted the 1993 and 1995 CYMA – Canadian Youth Mission to Armenia led by Archbishop Hovnan Derderian and Ronald Alepian.

References 

World Gazeteer: Armenia – World-Gazetteer.com
Report of the results of the 2001 Armenian Census

Populated places in Ararat Province